Sultan Kudarat's at-large congressional district is an obsolete congressional district that encompassed the entire province of Sultan Kudarat in the Philippines. It was represented in the House of Representatives from 1987 to 2007 and earlier in the Batasang Pambansa from 1984 to 1986. The province of Sultan Kudarat was created by the further division of Cotabato into three provinces in 1973 out of eleven southernmost municipalities of what remained of the former province. Due to the absence of a legislature since the 1972 imposition of martial law, no electoral district was formed in the new province under its charter. When a national parliament known as the Batasang Pambansa was convened in 1978, Sultan Kudarat and four other provinces in Central Mindanao were collectively represented by eight delegates who were elected across Region XII. The first time a provincewide at-large district was used to elect representatives for Sultan Kudarat was during the 1984 Philippine parliamentary election for a seat in the Regular Batasang Pambansa.

Sultan Kudarat continued to return one member from its at-large district to the restored House of Representatives beginning in 1987. This district became obsolete following the 2006 reapportionment into two districts that took effect in the 2007 Philippine House of Representatives elections.

Representation history

See also
Legislative districts of Sultan Kudarat

References

Former congressional districts of the Philippines
Politics of Sultan Kudarat
1984 establishments in the Philippines
2006 disestablishments in the Philippines
At-large congressional districts of the Philippines
Congressional districts of Soccsksargen
Constituencies established in 1984
Constituencies disestablished in 2006